Khan Kandi (also Romanized as Khān Kandī) is a village in Zarrineh Rud-e Jonubi Rural District, in the Central District of Miandoab County, West Azerbaijan Province, Iran. At the 2006 census, its population was 519, in 130 families.

References 

Populated places in Miandoab County